Betu may refer to:
Roberto Linck or "Betu" (born 1988 ), a professional soccer player and owner of Miami Dade FC
A synonym of Étraire de la Dui, a variety of grape
Betu, Iran, a village in Razavi Khorasan Province, Iran